Exposed is a 2003 American independent comedy film written and directed by Misti L. Barnes, starring Brenda Strong, Lumi Cavazos, Gia Carides, Tate Donovan and Missi Pyle.

Bob Smith (Donovan), the host of the scandalous news show "Probe", launches an investigation to dig up dirt on three popular television celebrities who are up for a "Woman of Distinction Award".

External links

2003 films
2003 comedy films
American comedy films
2000s English-language films
2000s American films